Gourmet Guru, Inc. is a New York–based natural and organic food distributor founded in 1996 by Jeff Lichtenstein. At initial stage of Gourmet Guru, Jeff distributed natural & Organic Food by the old truck. Gourmet Guru embracing Organic & Natural Food, before USDA officially defined terms.

Gourmet Guru launched new product in partnership with Sweet’tauk. Sweet’tauk lemonade is a fresh-squeezed & cold-pressed HPP lemonade. In 2016, Gourmet Guru celebrated its 20th anniversary.

Awards and recognition

 2011- Mayor Michael Bloomberg bestowed the title of Small Business of the Year for the Bronx.
 2012- ICIC Inner City 100 Award for speedy growth or being one of the fastest growing inner city firms in the United States.
 The delegation of British parliamentarians visited company headquarters in Bronx as part of their trip to local businesses.

References 

Companies established in 1996